Rowan Blanchard (born October 14, 2001) is an American actress. She was included on a list of Time's list of Most Influential Teens in 2015. She first became known for starring as Rebecca Wilson in Spy Kids: All the Time in the World (2011), and had her breakthrough portraying Riley Matthews on the Disney Channel series Girl Meets World (2014–2017), both of which earned her Young Artist Award nominations. She has since had roles as Jackie Geary on the ABC sitcom The Goldbergs (2017–2018), and Alexandra Cavill in the TNT series Snowpiercer (2020–present).

Early life
Blanchard was born in Los Angeles, California, to Elizabeth and Mark Blanchard-Boulbol, who are yoga instructors. Her paternal grandfather has Armenian, Syrian, Lebanese, and Moroccan ancestry; whereas her paternal grandmother's ancestors are from England, Denmark, and Sweden. Her paternal great-grandparents had met in Aleppo, present-day Syria. She was named after a character in Anne Rice's The Witching Hour. Rowan has two younger siblings, Carmen and Shane.

Career 
Blanchard began acting in 2006 at the age of five, first being cast as Mona's daughter in The Back-up Plan and was in the main cast of the Disney Junior Original Series Dance-a-Lot Robot as Caitlin. In 2011, she was cast as Rebecca Wilson in Spy Kids: All the Time in the World, and as Raquel Pacheco in Little in Common.

In late January 2013, Blanchard was cast as Riley Matthews in the Disney Channel series Girl Meets World. She also sings the title song, along with co-star Sabrina Carpenter. The titular character is the daughter of Cory and Topanga from Boy Meets World. She was an active member of Disney Channel Circle of Stars. In early January 2015, Blanchard was cast as Cleo in the Disney Channel Original Movie Invisible Sister. From 2017 to 2018, Blanchard had a recurring role on the ABC series The Goldbergs. In September 2017, Blanchard announced that she would be releasing a book, titled Still Here, which was published in February 2018. Blanchard also co-starred in the feature film adaptation A Wrinkle in Time, which was released in March 2018.

On March 27, 2019, it was reported by Deadline Hollywood that Blanchard was cast as Alexandra Cavill in TNT's Snowpiercer, a futuristic thriller starring Jennifer Connelly and Daveed Diggs based on the 2013 South Korean-Czech film of the same name by Bong Joon-ho, from Marty Adelstein’s Tomorrow Studios and Turner’s Studio T. Blanchard will be a guest star with an option to become a series regular in the series' second season.

She starred with Auli'i Cravalho in the Hulu movie, Crush, which was released in April 2022.

Personal life 

In 2014, Blanchard had revealed on Instagram that she had been struggling with depression. She wrote: "As I found myself, this year in particular, going through ups and downs with depression, I realized that instead of rejecting and ostracizing these teenage feelings (human feelings), I can learn to love the intensity of them and know that everything is momentary."

In a series of tweets in January 2016, she stated that while she had "only ever liked boys" in the past, she was "open to liking any gender" and therefore she identifies as queer.

Blanchard is an activist on issues such as feminism, human rights, and gun violence. While most of her comments regarding these issues are posted via Twitter or Tumblr, she has spoken at the UN Women and US National Committee's annual conference as part of #TeamHeForShe, a feminist campaign.

In April 2018, Blanchard criticized Israel and its military on her social media and shared her own post with a photo of Palestinian activist Ahed Tamimi holding the Palestinian flag. In the same post, Blanchard voiced support for the Palestinian side of the 2018–2019 Gaza border protests. In May 2018, Blanchard criticized Israel once again in her social media and shared another photo of Palestinian activist Ahed Tamimi. Blanchard wrote that "Gaza qualifies under every definition of genocide yet massacred protestors must always be identified as 'peaceful'."

Filmography

Awards and nominations

References

External links

2001 births
Living people
21st-century American actresses
Actresses from Los Angeles
American child actresses
American film actresses
American television actresses
American feminists
American people of English descent
American people of Danish descent
American people of Swedish descent
American people of Armenian descent
American people of Moroccan descent
American people of Lebanese descent
American people of Syrian descent
American people of Arab descent
American human rights activists
American queer actresses
Queer women
LGBT people from California
American gun control activists